Isaacson is a surname meaning "son of Isaac", the Biblical figure. 

People with the surname Isaacson include:

 Doug Isaacson (born 1957), American politician
 Jacob Isaacson (1911–1980), American composer and musician
 James Isaacson (born 1980), English rugby union football player 
 Megan Isaacson, American gospel singer
 Peter Isaacson (born 1920), English-born Australian newspaper publisher and military pilot
 Rich Isaacson (born 1964), American music entrepreneur
 Richard A. Isaacson, American physicist and promoter of LIGO
 Thorpe B. Isaacson (1898–1970), American leader in The Church of Jesus Christ of Latter-day Saints
 Walter Isaacson (born 1952), American author, columnist and CEO

Patronymic surnames